The Micca House, on Bridge St. in Paradise Valley, Nevada, is a historic house that was built in 1885.  It includes Stick/Eastlake architecture.  The building served as a department store, as a post office, and as a government office.  It is listed on the National Register of Historic Places.

In its NRHP nomination, written by its owner, it was argued to be "locally significant to its community for the great diversity of functions it contained, all vital in their time to the life of Paradise Valley."  It was listed on the NRHP in 1975.

References

Buildings and structures in Humboldt County, Nevada
Houses completed in 1885
Houses on the National Register of Historic Places in Nevada
Commercial buildings on the National Register of Historic Places in Nevada
Department stores on the National Register of Historic Places
Government buildings on the National Register of Historic Places in Nevada
National Register of Historic Places in Humboldt County, Nevada
Stick-Eastlake architecture in the United States
Victorian architecture in Nevada